"Live and Learn" is a song by the rock group The Cardigans, and is the third and final single from the album, Long Gone Before Daylight. All music by Peter Svensson, and all lyrics by Nina Persson. The song appears on episode 2 of Grey's Anatomy, and in a season 9 episode of Scrubs. The song is a straight love song about learning love, her thinking of what her love is worth.

Guest vocals performed by The Soundtrack of Our Lives singer, Ebbot Lundberg

Track listings
CD single
"Live and Learn" 
"If There Is a Chance"

Maxi single
"Live and Learn" 
"If There Is a Chance" 
"Changes" (BBC Radio 2 Session) 
"My Favourite Game" (BBC Radio 2 Session)

References

2003 singles
The Cardigans songs
2003 songs
Songs written by Nina Persson
Songs written by Peter Svensson
Stockholm Records singles